Vals-près-le-Puy (literally Vals near Le Puy), is a commune in the Haute-Loire department in south-central France.

Its inhabitants are called Valladiers (masc.) and Valladières (fem.).

Geography
The town is located in the valley of the river Dolaizon. It forms the South-West border of Le Puy-en-Velay and its highest point is Mount Ronzon (850 m).

History
Le Puy became part of the province of Velay in 1789.

Population

Sights
 Augustinian Monastery early 17th century. Historic Monument.
 Church of Saint Vosy, chapel of the monastery. 17th century. Historic Monument.

Personalities
Auguste Aymard, 1808–1889, mayor Vals-près-le-Puy, polymath (curator of the Crozatier museum, archivist, palaeontologist, archaeologist).
Joseph Rumillet Charretier, 1833–1916, grew verbena (Fr: verveine) at his property in Vals and founded the distillery Verveine du Velay in 1858.

International relations
The commune is twinned with Aielo de Malferit, (Spain).

See also
Communes of the Haute-Loire department

References

External links
 
 Official website 
 Vals-près-le-Puy on the Institut Géographique National site 
  Financial Data  for Vals-près-le-Puy from the Ministry of the Economy, Finances and Industry 
 
 Vals-près-le-Puy on the Cassini map 

Communes of Haute-Loire